Wild Lines: Improvising Emily Dickinson is a double studio album by American jazz saxophonist Jane Ira Bloom. The album was released on September 8, 2017 by Outline Reсords.

Background
This double album contains 30 tracks that were inspired by the writings of nineteenth-century American poet Emily Dickinson. Wild Lines was made possible by a commission from Chamber Music America's 2015 New Jazz Works Program, funded through the Doris Duke Charitable Foundation. The release was premiered at Dickinson's home in Amherst, MA and then was performed at The Kennedy Center. This is her 17th album as a band leader.

Reception
Britt Robson of JazzTimes wrote, "At the risk of courting gender stereotypes, there is a congruence between the way a ballerina moves and the music Jane Ira Bloom derives from her soprano saxophone on Wild Lines. To be able to blend refined grace and tensile strength into such an aesthetically pleasing flow requires both painstaking discipline and intuitive freedom. Bloom triumphs here on the straight horn because she is so doggedly enraptured, so coolly sublime." Roger Farbey writing for All About Jazz noted, "Whilst sharing identical titles and roughly the same structures, the tracks on each CD are subtly different. However, the captivating performances on both the instrumental recording and its spoken counterpart are equally enthralling." The Buffalo News 's Jeff Simon awarded the album four stars out of four, commenting, "One of the year's great jazz records by one of our greatest jazz poets and the brilliant friends who understand her completely."

Track listing

Personnel
Jane Ira Bloom – soprano saxophone
Dawn Clement – piano
Mark Helias – bass
Bobby Previte – drums
Deborah Rush – voice

References

External links

Jane Ira Bloom albums
2017 albums